Craig Thomas Endean (born April 13, 1968) is a Canadian former professional National Hockey League left winger. In the 1986–87 NHL season, he played two games for the Winnipeg Jets, and registered one assist.

Career statistics

Awards
 WHL East First All-Star Team – 1988

External links
 

1968 births
Living people
Adirondack Red Wings players
Canadian expatriate ice hockey players in the United States
Canadian ice hockey left wingers
Fort Wayne Komets players
Ice hockey people from British Columbia
Moncton Hawks players
Sportspeople from Prince George, British Columbia
Sportspeople from Kamloops
Regina Pats players
Seattle Breakers players
Seattle Thunderbirds players
Winnipeg Jets (1979–1996) draft picks
Winnipeg Jets (1979–1996) players
Winston-Salem Thunderbirds players